The 2020 FIBA U18 Women's African Championship was the 15th edition, played under the rules of FIBA, the world governing body for basketball, and the FIBA Africa thereof. The tournament was hosted by Egypt from December 3 to 9, 2020 in Cairo.

 won the tournament for their second continental title, their first since 2010, by defeating the defending champions  in the Finals, 68–63. Both finalists qualified for the 2021 FIBA U19 Women's Basketball World Cup that were held in Debrecen, Hungary. Yara Hussein, team captain of the host team, was named the Most Valuable Player of the tournament.

Venue 
All matches were played in the Hall 3 of the Cairo Stadium Indoor Halls Complex.

Preliminary round

Final round

Final

Final standings

References

External links

FIBA Africa Under-18 Championship for Women
2020 in African basketball
International basketball competitions hosted by Egypt
December 2020 sports events in Africa
FIBA